Belmedpreparaty, RUE (called Belpharm in English) is one of the largest pharmaceutical trading companies in the Republic of Belarus.  It was founded in the early 1990s as a joint venture between the Belarus health ministry and ITM Investment-Trade-Marketing GmbH to import Western pharmaceuticals following the Chernobyl disaster.

References 

Pharmaceutical companies of Belarus
Pharmaceutical companies of the Soviet Union
1929 establishments in the Soviet Union